Roger Anthony Enrico (November 11, 1944 – June 1, 2016) was an American businessman who is best known for his lengthy service as chief executive officer of PepsiCo.

Early life
Enrico was born on November 11, 1944, to Italian immigrants in the Mesabi Range mining town of Chisholm, Minnesota. He was awarded a scholarship to Babson College where he studied business administration. Enrico enlisted in the United States Navy and served in Vietnam.

Business career
Enrico started his business career with General Mills as a brand manager for Wheaties. In 1971, he joined PepsiCo to help market Funyuns. He later served as brand manager for Cheetos and Fritos before heading operations in Japan and South America. He was appointed CEO of the Pepsi division of PepsiCo in 1983 at the age of 38. That year he signed Michael Jackson to a multimillion-dollar marketing deal. Lionel Richie was later signed.

He was the Chairman of PepsiCo from 1996 to 2001, and Chairman of DreamWorks Animation SKG Inc from 2004 to 2012. He was well known for his business rivalry with fellow businessman Roberto Goizueta, CEO of Coca-Cola during his tenure as Pepsi's CEO.

He served on the board of directors of the National Geographic Society, the Environmental Defense Fund, the Solar Electric Light Fund, and the American Film Institute.

Death
Enrico died June 1, 2016, aged 71, while snorkelling in the Cayman Islands where he had a home.

References

1944 births
2016 deaths
People from Chisholm, Minnesota
PepsiCo people
Babson College alumni
Businesspeople from Minnesota
American people of Italian descent
DreamWorks Animation people
General Mills people
United States Navy personnel of the Vietnam War